Alfonso Parigi the Younger (1606–1656) was an Italian architect and scenographer, the son of Giulio Parigi, and grandson of Alfonso Parigi the Elder.

He worked mainly in Florence, beginning at a very early age as his father's assistant. After the latter's death in 1635, he became court architect of the Grand Dukes of Tuscany at Palazzo Pitti, where he led the completion of the Giardini di Boboli, building the Isolotto and the steps of the amphitheatre.

He also worked in the church of San Giovannino degli Scolopi, the basilica of Santo Spirito, and the Medici villas  at Poggio a Caiano and Careggi.

Sources
Opere di Filippo Baldinucci: Notizie de'professori del disegno da Cimabue in qua By Filippo Baldinucci, Domenico Maria Manni, page 439.
Bryan's dictionary of painters and engravers, Volume 4 By Michael Bryan, George Charles Williamson, page 68.

1606 births
1656 deaths
Architects from Florence
17th-century Italian architects
Italian scenic designers